The Front of Comrades for the Effectiveness and Transformation of Islamic Iran (Jibeheh-e Yarân-e Karâmid-e vâ Tehul 'Iran), known by the backronym YEKTA Front (Jibeheh Ikta, meaning Unique) is an Iranian principlist political group, formed in 2015. Founders of the group are former cabinet ministers, former members of parliament and other former officials close to Iran’s former president Mahmoud Ahmadinejad.

See also
Political parties in Iran

References 

Principlist political groups in Iran
Political parties established in 2015
2015 establishments in Iran